Crossite is an inosilicate double chain sodic amphibole and is a rare silicate mineral belonging to the riebeckite group. It is considered an intermediate between the amphiboles glaucophane and magnesioriebeckite, which form a series. IMA status: discredited 1997.

Crossite is named after Charles Whitman Cross, an American USGS petrologist.

References

External links
Crossite on Mindat
Crossite on Webmineral

Sodium minerals
Iron(II,III) minerals
Magnesium minerals
Amphibole group